Lien Khuong Airport (IATA: DLI, ICAO: VVDL) is an airport located in Đức Trọng District, about 30 km south of Da Lat, Lâm Đồng Province. It is the largest among 4 airports in the Central Highlands region of  Vietnam. The major reconstruction in order to handle bigger aircraft was completed in December 2009.
This airport handled 1,690,000 passengers in 2019, an increase of 18.3% against that of 2014.

History
Lien Khuong Airport  was built by the French colonists in 1933 with a 700-meter-long soil runway. 
From 1956 - 1960 American army reconstructed and upgraded Lien Khuong Airport with rather completed facilities is not the infrastructure is quite complete, the terminal was designed in French architecture, with three stories. The terminal had a capacity of 50,000 passengers per year or about 120 passengers/peak hour.

In 1957 there was a commercial flight 5 days a week from Saigon to Dalat operated by Air Vietnam utilising a Douglas DC-3.  The flight continued from Dalat to Banmethuot and then other cities before reversing its route. By 1962 the frequency had increased to 2 flights per day.  By 1969 the DC-3 planes had been replaced by DC-4s and an additional flight per day was added to the schedule.  By 1972 the frequency was reduced to 1 flight per day utilising DC-3 and DC-4s.

During 1964–1972, the runway, apron, packing, access roads went through improvement and reinforcement, the runway was refaced with asphalt from 8–10 cm in depth. As a result of this improvement, the runway reached 1,480 m long and 37 m wide, the apron was 23,100 square meters, apron of 2,106 square meters, access road was 2,100 meters long. Following the unification of Vietnam on 30 April 1975 until 1980, this airport was controlled and operated by the Vietnam People's Army, the airport mainly served high ranking governmental leaders on business and lifting residents from northern Vietnam to Lâm Đồng in the so-called "New Economic Movement".

From 1981 to 1985 Lien Khuong Airport served civil service flights with Ho Chi Minh City - Lien Khuong route (one flight weekly) on Yak-40 aircraft but all civil flights was suspended due to low passenger traffic.

Since 1992 Lien Khuong Airport resumed its civil services with Ho Chi Minh - Lien Khuong, and Huế – Lien Khuong on Yak-40 and was later replaced by ATR 72. The Huế – Lieng Khuong was later suspended.

Since October 2004, this airport has served more air link with Hanoi's Noi Bai International Airport  with Fokker 70 aircraft. As of December 2009, there are two daily flights to Ho Chi Minh City, one flight daily to Hanoi.

Military activity
Aeroflot Russia ran connection flights within Vietnam with Ilyushin Il-86 aircraft during 1981–89.  It is suspected that the Soviet VVS Air Force carried out operations from Lien Khuong after the fall of Saigon in April 1975.  Russia disbanded 2 of 3 defensive VVS interceptor squadrons consisting of Su-27, MiG-25, and 13 Yak-50 within Da lat in the summer of 1999.  The fate of the retired aircraft is unknown.  Possible transfer to People's Army of Vietnam PAVN and/or People's Air Defense Force of Vietnam PADFV to Hanoi.

Services
The new 12,400-square-meter passenger terminal was inaugurated on December 26, 2009.  
The new two-floor terminal will enable the Lien Khuong airport to serve international flights in the region in 2010.
The terminal is capable of receiving 1.5-2 million passengers per year.

Airlines and destinations

Proposed international destinations
The airport has been upgraded into international standard to serve international flights to Singapore, South Korea, Laos and Cambodia. The airport is served by international flights to Bangkok, Thailand, by Thai Vietjet Air and by AirAsia to Kuala Lumpur, Malaysia.

Statistics

Ground transport
A shuttle van to Da Lat is available for 40,000 dong; tickets are available near baggage collection, however seats quickly fill up.  A taxi would be around 250,000 dong (15 US dollars).

Accidents and incidents
On 29 December 1973, Douglas C-53D EM-3 of Air America overran the runway on landing. The aircraft was substantially damaged and was not salvaged due to the presence of land mines in the area. It was operating a non-scheduled passenger flight. All nine people on board survived.

See also

 List of airports in Vietnam

References

External links

Official website of Southern Airports Corporation

Airports in Vietnam
Airports established in 1933
Buildings and structures in Lâm Đồng province